The Way to Life:  At the Heart of the Tao Te Ching is Benjamin Hoff's first work about Taoism.  It was published in 1981 by Weatherhill.  

The work is a unique interpretation of the Tao Te Ching, an ancient Chinese text ascribed to Lao Tsu.  In it, Hoff weaves his translation and interpretation of the original texts with his own photographs of nature in Oregon.  The included essay, Taoist Principles Today, provides an explanation of how the principles of Taoism can be applied to people's lives in order to obtain happiness through non-egotistical methods.

The book has been out of print for a number of years.

1981 novels
Novels set in Oregon